Liris argentatus is a species of square-headed wasp in the family Crabronidae. It is found in the Caribbean, Central America, North America, and Oceania.

References

Crabronidae
Articles created by Qbugbot
Insects described in 1811